This is a list of accidents and disasters by death toll. It shows the number of fatalities associated with various explosions, structural fires, flood disasters, coal mine disasters, and other notable accidents caused by the effects of negligence of the human race connected to improper architecture, planning, construction, design, and more. Purposeful disasters, such as terrorist attacks, are omitted; those events can be found at List of battles and other violent events by death toll. 
 
While all of the listed accidents caused immediately massive numbers of lives lost, further widespread deaths were connected to many of these incidents, often the result of prolonged or lingering effects of the initial catastrophe. This was the case particularly in such cases as exposure to contaminated air, toxic chemicals or radiation, some years later due to lung damage, cancer, etc. Some numbers in the table below reflect both immediate and delayed deaths related to accidents, while many do not.

Engineering

Explosions

Industrial

Nuclear and radiation

Structural collapses

Structural fires

Recreation

Amusement parks

Crowd crushes

Sporting events

Transportation

Aviation

Cable cars

Elevators

Maritime

Rail

Road

Space

Other

Smog

See also
 Lists of death tolls

References

Lists by death toll

ang:Dēaðes toln
et:Hukkunute arv